Pseudovates chlorophaea, with the common name Texas unicorn mantis, is a species of praying mantis in the family Mantidae. It is native to the southern United States, Mexico, Central America, and northern South America.

Background
Specimens in the United States are presently only known from southernmost Texas. The Florida record from Blatchley, 1920 is the only known record and has never been substantiated.

Nymphs are brown-striped and arise from small, globular oothecae that are reddish brown in color. The horn on the head is formed of two pieces and is very small in the early instars, similar in appearance to two knobs in the first instar. As specimens grow, they overlap and appear to be a single large, horn though they are not fused. The adults are not as cryptic and have bright green wings with dark brown splotches. Females form four to ten oothecae, usually on thin branches. These hatch in approximately six weeks and contain thirty to fifty eggs per ootheca. There is no ootheca diapause.

See also
 List of mantis genera and species

References

 USA Mantis
 Dichotomous Key to Species of Mantids that may occur in Florida Blanchard listing is correct, scientific name is spelled wrong, and Blatchley reference is to finding this species in Florida, not description or year.
  Mantodea Species File Phyllovates chlorophaea page.

Mantidae
Mantodea of North America
Mantodea of South America
Arthropods of Colombia
Insects of Central America
Insects of Mexico
Insects of the United States
Invertebrates of Venezuela
Fauna of the Southwestern United States
Natural history of Texas
Insects described in 1836